Nano Assault is a shoot 'em up video game developed by Shin'en Multimedia for the Nintendo 3DS, originally published as a retail title by Majesco Entertainment in 2011, while the Japanese version was published by CyberFront on 19 April 2012. It is the spiritual successor to the Nintendo DS games Nanostray and Nanostray 2.

In March 2013, Shin'en published an enhanced version entitled Nano Assault EX, with visual improvements and additional gameplay features. This version is distributed exclusively via the Nintendo eShop.

Gameplay

Players blast their way through 32 twisted cell stages and dark worlds with rugged landscapes that adjust in difficulty based on the player's skill level.

Reception

Nano Assault

Nano Assault received "generally favourable reviews" according to the review aggregation website Metacritic.

Nano Assault EX

Nano Assault EX received above-average reviews according to Metacritic.

References

External links
 for Nano Assault
 for Nano Assault EX

2011 video games
CyberFront games
Multidirectional shooters
Nintendo 3DS eShop games
Nintendo 3DS games
Nintendo 3DS-only games
Nintendo Network games
Shoot 'em ups
Single-player video games
Video games developed in Germany